Julius Wilhelm Gintl (November 12, 1804 – December 22, 1883) was an Austrian physicist. He was notable as the developer of an early form of duplex electrical telegraph, which allowed two messages to be transmitted on a single wire, in opposite directions. This duplex communication was an early specific case of the general practice of multiplexing.

Gintl's method would be developed to economic viability by J. B. Stearns, and the refined method used in Edison's implementation of a quadruplex telegraph.

19th-century Austrian physicists
1804 births
1883 deaths